Jean-Philippe Sabo (born 26 February 1987) is a French former professional footballer who played as a defender.

Career
Born in Gouvieux, Sabo began his career with Marseille, making his debut during the 2007–08 season. Sabo spent the 2008–09 season on loan at Montpellier. In July 2009, Sabo agreed to spend the 2009–10 season on loan at Ajaccio. In the same month, Sabo's contract at l'OM was extended to June 2012. Sabo was released by Marseille in June 2012.

In September 2012 he underwent a trial at OGC Nice, which was unsuccessful. In October 2012, Sabo undertook a trial with English club Nottingham Forest.

After leaving RC Strasbourg Alsace upon expiration of his contract in June 2016, Sabo joined lower league side AS Erstein in the 2016–17 season hoping to return to professional football.

Honours
Marseille
Coupe de la Ligue: 2010–11
Trophée des Champions: 2010, 2011

References

External links
 
 

1987 births
Living people
Association football defenders
French footballers
Olympique de Marseille players
Montpellier HSC players
AC Ajaccio players
RC Strasbourg Alsace players
Ligue 1 players
Ligue 2 players
Championnat National players
Championnat National 2 players
Championnat National 3 players